Labathude is a commune in the Lot department in south-western France.

Geography 

Labthude is located in Quercy, in Ségala.
Positioned at the beginning of Massif Central, Labathude is located between 310m (minimum) and 613m (maximum) above sea level.

Location 

Labathude is a commune located between Lacapelle-Marival and Latronquière. The biggest city next to Labathude is Figeac (at about 20 km).

References

Communes of Lot (department)